Srbija Voz (English: Serbia Train) is the national passenger railway company of Serbia. Srbija Voz is an associate member of the International Union of Railways (UIC) since 2016.

History
In March 2015, the Government of Serbia announced its plan to establish three new railway companies, splitting the Serbian Railways state-owned company into separate businesses – passenger (Srbija Voz), cargo (Srbija Kargo) and infrastructure (Serbian Railways Infrastructure). Srbija Voz was founded on 10 August 2015, as the national passenger railway company of Serbia, after being split from the Serbian Railways, in the process of reconstruction and better optimization of business.

In February 2019, Srbija Voz temporarily suspended transportation on Belgrade–Novi Sad railway, one of the country’s most frequent passenger routes, in February 2022, due to the railway line’s reconstruction. This line in now completely reconstructed and modernized and the Fast trains - named "SOKO" are going up to 200 km/h, connecting two biggest cities in 36 minutes. The route is 75km long and its reconstruction is currently extended from Novi Sad to Subotica, (border with Hungary) for the speed of 200 km/h as part of the modernization of the Belgrade-Budapest railway line.

The reconstruction and modernization of the railway lines is also planned between Belgrade and Niš for the speed of 200 km/h, Niš and Preševo for the speed of 160 km/h(border with North Macedonia) and Niš and Dimitrovgrad for the speed of 120 km/h(border with Bulgaria).

Passenger transport

Srbija Voz inherited the passenger transport from the Serbian Railways following the establishment. Since 2015, it offers many train services across the country and in the region which include international routes to neighbouring countries and domestic routes (fast, regional and local lines).

It is possible to buy passengers tickets online throughout Srbija Voz website: https://webapi1.srbvoz.rs/ekarta/app/#!/home. The company also offer the mobile application for Android (https://play.google.com/store/apps/details?id=com.srbijavoz.app) and IOS (https://apps.apple.com/rs/app/srbija-voz/id1600735042) operating systems.

Domestic railway network

The Serbian railway system consists of 3,739 km of rails of which 295 km is double track (7.9% of the network). Some 1,279 km of track (33.6% of the network) is electrified. Serbia has rail links with all of adjacent countries, except Albania.

Railroads are categorized as "main lines", "regional lines", "local lines" or "manipulative lines". Following is the table of main lines in Serbia:

Inter-City Trains

Srbija Voz operates Inter-City train called "SOKO" in Serbian, from Belgrade to Novi Sad with KISS 200 EMU that goes up to 200 km/h and reaches the destination in 36 minutes. This rail connection is the busiest one in Serbia.

Regional Trains

The Regio is a service that offers domestic connections to Novi Sad, Subotica, Niš, Zrenjanin, Valjevo, Kraljevo, Užice, Sombor, Požarevac, Zaječar, Vršac, Kikinda, Prokuplje and Ruma. FLIRT3 EMU of Class 413 provide the service on electrified lines, while on non-electrified lines transport is provided by RA2 DMU of Class 711.

Regio trains also operate on the route from Kraljevo to North Mitrovica in North Kosovo, which is as a domestic route in Serbia’s point of view, but an international route in Kosovo’s point of view.

Local Trains

BG Voz is an urban rail system that serves the city of Belgrade. 20 Electric multiple units of Class 412, built by RVR, serve the system that is integrated in the city public transport ticketing.

 International railway network 

 Srbija Voz operates EuroCity trains on following routes:

Train Avala connects Belgrade to Vienna 
Train Beograd connects Belgrade  to Budapest 
Train Balkan connects Belgrade  to Sofia 
Train Hellas connects Belgrade  to Thessaloniki 

Srbija Voz other international rail routes are:

Train Tara connects Belgrade  to Bar

Rolling stock

 Electric locomotives
 ŽS 441 with total of: 44 units (29 in service)
 ŽS 444 with total of: 30 units (23 in service)
 ŽS 461 with total of: 51 units (35 in service)
 ŽS 193 with total of: 16 units (16 in service)
 Diesel locomotives
 ŽS 621 with total of: 17 units (N/A in service)
 ŽS 622 with total of: 4 units in total (4 in service) 
 ŽS 641 with total of: 37 units (11 in service)
 ŽS 644 with total of: 6 units (2 in service)
 ŽS 661 with total of: 42 units (23 in service)
 ŽS 664 with total of: 6 units on lease from Slovenian Railways)
 ŽS 666 with total of: 4 units (2 in service)
 Electric trainsets
 ŽS 412 with total of: 20 units (14 in service)
 ŽS 413 with total of: 21 units (21 in service) - Stadler FLIRT
 ŽS 410 with total of: 3 units (3 in service) - Stadler KISS
 Diesel trainsets
 ŽS 710 with total of: 10 units (10 in service)
 ŽS 711 with total of: 39 units (39 in service)
 Passenger carriages
 Passenger cars - "open" or "compartment" with total of: 364 units
 Sleeping cars   with total of: 52 units
 Couchette cars with total of: 63 units
 Dining cars.      with total of: 15 units

See also
 Transport in Serbia
 Serbian Railways
 Serbian Railways Infrastructure
 Srbija Kargo

References

External links
 
 Informator o radu 

Companies based in Belgrade
Government-owned companies of Serbia
Rail transport in Serbia
Railway companies established in 2015
Serbian brands
Serbian Railways
Transport companies of Serbia
Serbian companies established in 2015